György Demeter (born February 24, 1957 in Szarvas, Hungary) is a former Hungarian volleyball player. He also coached for Hungary men's national volleyball team, Erdemirspor where he won Turkish Men's Volleyball League both by player and coach and Fenerbahçe Istanbul from Turkey.

Honors
Turkish Men's Volleyball League
Erdemirspor (2): 2003-04, 2004–05
Fenerbahçe Istanbul (2): 2007-08, 2009–10
Turkish Cup
Fenerbahçe Istanbul (1): 2007-08

References

External links 
 Player profile at fenerbahce.org

1959 births
Living people
Hungarian men's volleyball players
Fenerbahçe volleyball coaches
People from Szarvas
Sportspeople from Békés County